Botswana competed at the 2000 Summer Olympics in Sydney, Australia.

Athletics

Men
Track and road events

Boxing

Men

See also
 Botswana at the 1998 Commonwealth Games
 Botswana at the 2002 Commonwealth Games

References
Official Olympic Reports
sports-reference

Nations at the 2000 Summer Olympics
2000
Olympics